The People Party is an Islamist party in Egypt which is part of the Anti-Coup Alliance.

History and profile
On 8 October 2012 the Egyptian Salafist Front proposed the creation of a new political party, to be named the People Party. The party was established on 20 October 2012. According to Ahmed Mawlana, the official party spokesman, the People Party will deal with issues that it perceives to be neglected by other Islamic parties, such as "the Nubians’ rights, as well as those of farmers and workers".

Political program 
The People Party prioritizes seeking justice and identity. Individuals and groups that overuse government resources are not appreciated. Identity is paramount, with a special emphasis on cultural, economic, and political independence. Subsidized education is encouraged. Support of Palestine in the Israeli-Palestinian Conflict is an additional plank of the party's platform.

References

2012 establishments in Egypt
Islamic political parties in Egypt
Political parties established in 2012
Political parties in Egypt
Populist parties
Salafi groups
Sunni Islamic political parties